Monteleone  is an Italian surname. Notable people with the surname include:

 Davide Monteleone, photographer
 Enzo Monteleone (born 1954), film director and screenwriter
 Rich Monteleone (born 1963), Major League Baseball pitcher and coach
 Thomas F. Monteleone (born 1946), science fiction and horror fiction author

See also 

 Monteleone (disambiguation)

Italian-language surnames